The Drumheller Institution is a medium-security prison operated in Drumheller, Alberta by the Correctional Service of Canada. It was opened in 1967, and also includes a 72-bed minimum-security facility. As of 6 April 2004, the medium security section had a rated capacity of 598.

References 
 Correctional Service of Canada website

Correctional Service of Canada institutions
Prisons in Alberta
Buildings and structures in Drumheller
1967 establishments in Alberta